Miracle of Life may refer to:

Movies 
 The Miracle of Life (film), a 1926 film
 The Miracle of Life, a 1982 documentary about the human reproductive process

Other media 
 Miracles of Life, an 2008 autobiography by British writer J. G. Ballard
 "Miracle of Life", a song by Yes on Union